Sigytes is a genus of jumping spiders that was first described by Eugène Louis Simon in 1902.  it contains only three species, found only on Fiji, in Australia, and Sri Lanka: S. albocinctus, S. diloris, and S. paradisiacus.

References

Salticidae
Salticidae genera
Spiders of Asia
Spiders of Australia